Ruth Schachter Morgenthau (January 26, 1931 – November 4, 2006), was a professor of international politics at Brandeis University and an advisor to President Jimmy Carter on rural development in poor countries.

Biography
She was born in Vienna, Austria, on January 26, 1931, as Ruth Schachter. Her parents, Osias Schachter and Mizia (Kramer) Schachter, owned a textile importing company until they fled from the Nazis in 1940. She graduated from Barnard College in 1952, then attended the Institut d'Études Politiques in Paris as a Fulbright scholar. In 1958, she received a doctorate in politics from Oxford.

She was a member of the United States Mission to the United Nations, and in 1988 ran unsuccessfully as a Democratic candidate for Congress in Rhode Island. She was an advocate of ''bottom-up'' aid to farmers and villagers in the third world and was a mentor to Nancy Hafkin who brought the internet connectivity to Africa.

Ruth married to Henry Morgenthau in 1962. They had two sons: Henry (Ben) Morgenthau (born 1964) and cinematographer Kramer Morgenthau (born 1966); and a daughter, Sarah Elinor Morgenthau Wessel (born 1963).

She died on November 4, 2006, aged 75, in Boston, Massachusetts.

Awards
In 1964, she wrote Political Parties in French-Speaking West Africa, which won the 1965 Herskovitz Prize.

References

External links
Papers of Ruth S. Morgenthau, 1925-2006 (inclusive), 1963-2000 (bulk): A Finding Aid. Schlesinger Library, Radcliffe Institute, Harvard University.

1931 births
2006 deaths
Emigrants from Austria after the Anschluss
Austrian emigrants to the United States
American political consultants
Barnard College alumni
École nationale d'administration alumni
Lehman family
Ruth
Alumni of Nuffield College, Oxford